This is a list of American desserts and pies. The cuisine of the United States refers to food preparation originating from the United States of America. The various styles continued expanding well into the 19th and 20th centuries, proportional to the influx of immigrants from many foreign nations; such influx developed a rich diversity in food preparation throughout the country.

American Desserts

A.

  Apple pie 
  Angel food cake
  Apple crisp
  Apple dumpling

B.

 Banana split
 Bananas Foster
 Banana pudding
 Black and white cookies
 Blackout cake
 Blondie
 Boston cream doughnut
 Boston cream pie
 Butter mochi

C.
Cookie Dough

  Candy
 Ice cream
  Caramel
  Cinnamon rolls
  Checkerboard cake
  Cheesecake
  Chocolate brownie
  Chocolate chip cookie
  Chocolate-covered bacon
  Chocolate-covered fruit
  Chocolate-covered potato chips
  Chocolate pudding
  Cobbler
  Coconut cake
  Cookie salad
  Corn cookie
 Cube toast
  Cupcake
  Cupcone
  Cannoli

D.

 Dessert bar
  Devil's food cake
  Dirt cake
  Doberge cake
  Doughnut (also spelled "donut")

F.

  Fried dough
  Fried ice cream
  Frozen yogurt
  Fudge
  Funnel cake
  Fruit pizza
  Fudge cake

G.
  German chocolate cake
  Gingerbread
  Glorified rice
  Golden Opulence Sundae
  Gooey butter cake
  Grasshopper pie

H.

  Hasty pudding
  Haupia
  Hermit cookies
  Hostess (snack cakes)
  Hostess CupCake
  Hot milk cake
  Hummingbird cake

I.

  Ice cream cake
  Ice cream cone
  Icebox cake
  Ice cream

J.
  Jell-O
  Jelly bean
  Joe Froggers

K. 

 Key lime pie

L.

 Lady Baltimore cake
 Lane cake
 Lava cake
 Lemon bar

M.
  Marshmallow creme
  Mochi donuts
  Molten chocolate cake
  Moon Pie
  Moravian spice cookies

N.
  Needham

O.
  Oatmeal cookie
  Orange creamsicle cake
  Oreo

P.

  Panocha
  Parfait
  Pastry hearts
  Peanut butter cookies
  Pecan pie
  Pecan pralines
  Persimmon pudding
  Peppermint stick
  Pistachio pudding
  Pudding
  Pumpkin Pie
  Pop-Tarts
  Pancake
  Pound cake

R.
  Red velvet cake
  Rice Krispie treat
  Rice pudding

S.

  Salt Water Taffy
  Scotcheroos
  Shave ice
  Shaved ice
  S'more
  Smith Island cake
  Snack cake
  Snickerdoodles
  Snickers salad
  Soft serve ice cream
  Sopaipilla
  Stack cake
  Strawberry Delight
  Strawberry shortcake
  Sundae
  Swiss roll
   Scone

T.

  Tapioca pudding
  Tipsy cake
  Twinkie

W.
  Waldorf pudding
  Watergate salad
  Whoopie pie
  Waffle

American pies

  Apple crisp 
  Apple pie 
  Bean pie 
  Black bottom pie
  Blackberry pie 
  Blueberry pie 
  Bob Andy pie 
  Bumbleberry pie
  Buttermilk pie 
  Cherry pie 
  Chess pie
  Chiffon pie
  Cream pie 
  Derby pie 
  Fried pie
  Grape pie 
  Grasshopper pie
  Huckleberry pie
  Jefferson Davis pie
  Jelly cream pie 
  Key lime pie 
  Lemon meringue pie 
  Maraca pie
  Mississippi mud pie 
  Pecan pie  
  Pumpkin pie 
  Rhubarb pie
  Shaker lemon pie
  Shoofly pie 
  Strawberry rhubarb pie 
  Sweet potato pie

See also
 Cuisine
 List of American foods
 List of American regional and fusion cuisines
 List of desserts

References

External links
 

 
Dessert-related lists
American cuisine-related lists